Ivan Kamaras (born 22 December 1972) is a Hungarian actor who became first known worldwide for his role as Agent Steel in the 2008 superhero fantasy thriller Hellboy II: The Golden Army, directed by Guillermo del Toro. Kamaras voices the title character in the 2018 Hungarian animated feature Ruben Brandt, Collector.

Personal life
Kamarás was born and raised in Pécs, Hungary. His mother, Teodóra Uhrik, and his stepfather, Pál Lovas, were both ballet dancers, and much of his childhood was spent in theatres. When he was seven, the family acquired a recording of the 1980 BBC production of Hamlet starring Derek Jacobi as Hamlet and Patrick Stewart as Claudius. Kamarás fell in love with the role of Hamlet and within two or three years had learned Hamlet's monologues from the play by heart. He was in elementary school when he became a regular member of an amateur acting company and by the time he was in high school he played his first serious role in a performance of the Pecs Chamber Theater. From 1991 to 1995, he studied at the Academy of Theatre and Film in Budapest.

Following that he worked for some major theatrical companies and alternative theater groups in addition to becoming one of Hungary's leading actors. By 2009 he was still performing on stage at various theaters but he felt a strong desire to concentrate more on movies. To further develop himself in this area and gain international exposure he decided to move to the United States. First he studied directing then he took several film making and acting courses for a number of years. Based on his Hungarian and American studies and experience he teaches acting classes at the first accredited Hungarian school specialized in training movie actors, which opened its doors to students in the fall of 2012.

His hobbies include sports and fitness training. He likes to promote charitable causes. Since 2014 he is an Ambassador for the  "Keznyom" campaign of SOS Children's Villages in Hungary.

Career

Theatre
From 1995 until 1997 he was a member of the Budapest Chamber Theatre, between 1997 and 2008 a member of the Comedy Theatre of Budapest. He won widespread admiration for his first role playing Othello at the age of 23 in 1995. For the Budapest Chamber Theatre he has also starred as Horst in Martin Sherman’s Bent (1996), Treplyov in Anton Chekhov’s The Seagull (1997), Stanley Kowalski in Tennessee Williams's A Streetcar Named Desire in 1999 (a role he had previously played for the National Theatre of Győr in 1997), Romeo in Romeo and Juliet (1998), and James Tyrone Jr in A Moon for the Misbegotten by Eugene O’Neill (2003).

For the Comedy Theatre of Budapest he has played Wayne in Ben Elton’s Popcorn (1998), Alyosha in an adaptation of Dostoevsky's The Brothers Karamazov (1999), Edmund in King Lear (2001), Su Fu in Brecht’s The Good Person of Szechwan (2001), Raskolnikov in an adaptation of Dostoevsky's Crime and Punishment (2001), Eugenio in The Coffee House by Carlo Goldoni (2005), Benedict in Much Ado About Nothing (2007), and Trofimov and Pjotr Sergeyevich in The Cherry Orchard (2007).

He has also played Julien Sorel in an adaptation of The Red and the Black by Stendhal for Gyor National Theatre (1995), Brick in Williams's Cat on a Hot Tin Roof (2000) for the Pest Theatre, Antony in Antony and Cleopatra (2002) for the Pest Theatre, Robert Dudley, Earl of Leicester in Friedrich Schiller’s Mary Stuart (2006) for the Pest Theatre, Christian in Festen for the Pest Theatre (2006), Jamie in Jason Robert Brown’s one-act musical two-hander The Last Five Years for the Palace of the Arts (2007), a role he debuted in Hungary, and Ruy Blas in the Szeged National Theatre production of Victor Hugo's Ruy Blas (2009).

Film

Aside from his role as Agent Steel in Hellboy II: The Golden Army, Kamarás has had an extensive career in Hungarian cinema. Notable roles have included the hit bedroom farce Out of Order (1997), in which he played a jealous boxer in pursuit of his errant girlfriend and her politician lover, the thriller Európa expressz (1999), in which he played Jimmy, a man who becomes caught up in events when the train he is in is hijacked by a Russian mafia boss, and more recently the cult comedy GlassTiger 3 (2010), in which he played Ferenc Csopkai, a rich lawyer who pursues the bumbling heroes after they steal his car and with it a huge sum in cash. In 2013 Kamarás starred in the film Outpost: Rise of the Spetsnaz.

Television
In addition to Silent Witness – in which his character, detective Tibor Orban, helped to uncover a baby-farming racket in Budapest while trying to track down series regular, forensic pathologist Dr Harry Cunningham – Kamarás has played Pipin, the son of Charlemagne, in the miniseries Charlemagne (1993); Louis II, King of Hungary, in the costume drama Mohacs (1995); Ivan, a man who becomes obsessed on his wedding day with his newly met twin sister in Alice and the Seven Wolves (2009); and the machiavellian nightclub owner and antihero Evil in the 10-part drama First Generation (2001). He was also the creative force behind Mobile Poem, a series of poetry readings done by notable Hungarian actors and filmed on mobile phone, which screened on the Hungarian TV channel MTV1 in 2009. In January 2011, he played a Hungarian detective, Tibor Orban, in Bloodlines, the fourth episode in the 14th series of the BBC crime drama Silent Witness. In 2014 he played the role of Rasputin in the two-part History Channel miniseries Houdini.

Music
He has released two solo pop albums – Bombajó (2000), and Revelation (2005) – and been a contributor to two others, So We Sing (2003) and Actor Songs (2009).

Directing
Kamarás has shot an experimental film on his mobile phone, Sigh, which was inspired by the Yukio Mishima drama Aoi no Ue and which screened at the Hungarian Film Festival in 2005 and the Moziünnep film festival in 2006. He undertook a course in directing at UCLA in 2009 and in the same year directed a production of Tchaikovsky’s opera Eugene Onegin at Keszthely Castle, Hungary.

Awards
Szinikritikusok critics’ award (1996) for Othello,
Andor Ajtay memorial award (2000), given annually to the best actor and actress in the Comedy Theatre of Budapest,
Hegedűs Gyula award (2000) for Cat on a Hot Tin Roof,
Súgó Csiga díj (2003) a prize for most popular actor voted for by audiences,
Mari Jászai Award (2006) a state award given in recognition for acting excellence, is the premier award of national dramatic artists,
VII. National Theatre Festival of Pécs (2007) for best male actor of the year award for Festen,
Gold Medallion Award (2012) actor of the year audience award

Theatrical roles
Number of his registered theatrical presentations in the Hungarian Theatre Database : 56.

Theatre Directing
9 marc 2009, Keszthely, Pyotr Ilyich Tchaikovsky: Eugene Onegin (opera) (directed by: Ivan Kamaras)

Filmography

Film

Television

Video Games

Sync
Selection from the Hungarian Online Sync Database

References

External links

Further images annakirschner.com

1972 births
Living people
Hungarian male stage actors
Hungarian male film actors
Hungarian male television actors